Australiseiulus is a genus of mites in the Phytoseiidae family.

Species
 Australiseiulus angophorae (Schicha, 1981)
 Australiseiulus australicus (Womersley, 1954)
 Australiseiulus dewi Beard, 1999
 Australiseiulus goondi Beard, 1999
 Australiseiulus laterisetus Moraes, Oliveira & Zannou, 2001
 Australiseiulus poplar Beard, 1999

References

Phytoseiidae